The MSU Moorhead Dragons (also MSUM Dragons and formerly Moorhead State Dragons) are the athletic teams that represent Minnesota State University Moorhead, located in Moorhead, Minnesota, in NCAA Division II intercollegiate sports. The Dragons generally compete as members of the Northern Sun Intercollegiate Conference for all 14 varsity sports.

Varsity teams

Minnesota State University Moorhead plays in the Northern Sun Intercollegiate Conference as one of the charter members. The conference was founded as the Northern Teachers Athletic Conference in 1932, when MSUM was Moorhead State Teachers College. For decades, the NSIC competed in the National Association of Intercollegiate Athletics. In 1964, MSUM won the NAIA national championship in wrestling. The NSIC entered the National Collegiate Athletic Association in 1992 and by 1995 full members at the Division II level.

In total, the Dragons have won 101 conference championships, with 77 in men's sports and 24 in women's

List of teams

Facilities

The Dragons football team plays at Alex Nemzek Stadium, a 6,000 seat facility. The stadium is named after the school's athletic director from 1923–1941. In 2015, the stadium received a renovation, with the added title of Scheels Field. 

Nemzek's name is also on the 3,500 seat fieldhouse and basketball arena. In 2012, Nemzek Fieldhouse was renovated, with new sound systems, scoreboards and a 144-square foot video board installed.  The next year, a new basketball court was installed in the arena. 

The school's soccer and softball fields are also named after Nemzek.

Football
MSUM has 16 NSIC titles. They won the conference in 1932, 1934, 1935, 1947, 1952, 1966, 1971, 1973, 1979, 1981, 1982, 1984, 1988, 1989, 1991 and 1995.

Steve Laqua, the Dragons' 17th football coach, was hired in spring 2011 after helming the Fargo Shanley High School program. In 2015, after defeating Minnesota Crookston 59–21, the Dragons earned their first winning season since 2006 with a 6–5 record. The next year, Laqua's team increased its win total to 7–4. While the Dragons finished with a losing 5–6 record in 2017, the 18 wins over those three years were the most victories since the 1995–1997 seasons.

The 2018 campaign proved to be Laqua's best season so far with the Dragons, earning an 8–4 record and a trip to the Mineral Water Bowl. In the regular season finale, the Dragons defeated St. Cloud State University to earn their eighth win, their most victories since 1991. The Mineral Water Bowl, which the Dragons lost 51–16 to Missouri University of Science and Technology, was the first postseason game for MSUM since 1994.

After a 6–5 campaign in 2019 where they finished the season by defeating St. Cloud State University, the Dragons did not play in 2020 because of the coronavirus pandemic. In 2021, the team returned to action, finishing 5–6. The following season, MSUM would go 4-7, losing the finale against Wayne State College. 

Rivalries

The Red River Valley Showdown vs the University of Minnesota Crookston Golden Eagles for the State Farm Traveling Trophy. MSUM leads the series 14–7. The series ended in 2020 when UMC cut its football program.

The Battle for the Paddle Trophy vs the University of Mary (Bismarck). The series is tied 8-8. The Paddle was developed by the student governments, as both schools are located near a river. UMary is located on the Missouri River and MSUM is near the Red River. 

The Battle for the Axe vs Bemidji State University. MSUM leads 37–33–3 in the series for the trophy which dates back to 1948. The axe originated in the village of Mount Hagon, New Guinea. The series as a whole dates back to 1929, with MSUM holding a 47–38–3 series lead in total.

The Dragons also had a cross-town rivalry with Concordia College in Moorhead. Concordia leads the now defunct rivalry 49–25–12, winning the final game in a 34–32 thriller. Today Concordia plays at the NCAA Division III level in the Minnesota Intercollegiate Athletic Conference. The two schools still play in other sports, such as basketball.

Men's basketball
MSUM has won four division titles and six conference titles in the NSIC. The Dragons won conference titles in 1964–1965, 1970–1971, 1980–1981, 1981–1982, 2014–2015 and 2016–2017. The Dragons have also earned seven trips to the NSIC Tournament Final, winning the title in 2022 and 2023. 

Minnesota State University Moorhead was coached by Chad Walthall from 2010–2022. In his second season, he led the team back to the post season for the first time since 1965 and the first 20 win season since 1982. In an exhibition game to start his second season, Walthall's team earned a 90–84 win in double overtime against the Division I North Dakota State University Bison, located in Moorhead's neighboring city of Fargo.

His Dragon teams have made the NCAA Division II Basketball Tournament six times, the latest berth in 2022 via the NSIC tournament title. In the 2015 tournament, the Dragons reached the Division II Elite Eight. That season, he was named conference, Central Region and National coach of the year.

In March 2022, Walthall retired from the head coaching position. Walthall's successor is Tim Bergstraser. In his first season at the helm, 2022-2023, Bergstraser led the Dragons to an NSIC Tournament Championship.

Women's basketball
MSUM has earned six conference titles, with championship seasons in 1981–1982, 1984–1985, 2004–2005, 2016–2017, 2017–2018 and 2018–2019. The team has also won four division titles.

Current Head Coach Karla Nelson has been with MSUM since 2000. Nelson has led the Dragons on six trips to the NCAA Division II tournament. She's earned coach of the year honors from the NSIC four times.

Non-varsity teams
MSUM has a wide variety of intramural sports including flag football, softball, and soccer. Club teams are also available for men's and women's rugby, men's and women's lacrosse, and baseball which compete nationally. MSU Moorhead also has a club ice hockey team, which began play in the  2018–2019 season. The team is part of the American Club Hockey Association, participating at the Division II level.

References

External links